Ahmet Özcan (born 7 March 1995) is a Swiss footballer who plays as a centre-back for Bulle.

Club career 
Özcan made his professional debut for Lausanne in a Swiss Super League 4–0 loss to FC Zürich on 7 December 2013. He transferred over to Kayserispor on 2014, wherein he only made appearances with the youth team and then briefly transferred to Gençlerbirliği.

International career
Özcan was born in Switzerland and is of Turkish descent. He is a youth international for Switzerland at the U19 level.

References

External links
 
 Ozcan SFL Profile
 Ozcan Eurosport Profile
 
 
 

1995 births
Sportspeople from Lausanne
Swiss people of Turkish descent
Living people
Swiss men's footballers
Switzerland youth international footballers
Association football defenders
FC Lausanne-Sport players
Kayserispor footballers
Gençlerbirliği S.K. footballers
Hacettepe S.K. footballers
FC Sion players
Real Balompédica Linense footballers
FC Köniz players
FC Dunărea Călărași players
FC Vevey United players
FC Bulle players
Swiss Super League players
2. Liga Interregional players
TFF Second League players
Swiss Promotion League players
Segunda División B players
Liga II players
Swiss 1. Liga (football) players
Swiss expatriate footballers
Swiss expatriate sportspeople in Turkey
Expatriate footballers in Turkey
Swiss expatriate sportspeople in Spain
Expatriate footballers in Spain
Swiss expatriate sportspeople in Romania
Expatriate footballers in Romania